Marco Tol (born 25 April 1998) is a Dutch professional footballer who plays as a defender for SC Cambuur.

Club career
He made his Eerste Divisie debut for Volendam on 29 September 2017 in a game against Dordrecht, as an 82nd-minute substitute for Nick Runderkamp.

References

External links
 

1998 births
People from Volendam
Living people
Dutch footballers
Netherlands youth international footballers
Association football defenders
FC Volendam players
SC Cambuur players
Eredivisie players
Eerste Divisie players
Derde Divisie players
Footballers from North Holland